Francis Thomas Farrell (born November 14, 1941 in Ohio, United States) is an American mathematician who has made contributions in the area of topology and differential geometry. Farrell is a distinguished professor emeritus of mathematics at Binghamton University. He also holds a position at the Yau Mathematical Sciences Center, Tsinghua University.

Biographical data
Farrell got his bachelor's degree in 1963 from the University of Notre Dame and earned his Ph.D in Mathematics from Yale University in 1967. His Ph.D. advisor was Wu-Chung Hsiang, and his doctoral thesis title was "The Obstruction to Fibering a Manifold over a Circle". He was a NSF Post-doctoral Fellow at the University of California at Berkeley from 1968 to 1969, and became an Assistant Professor there from 1969 to 1972. He then went to Pennsylvania State University, where he was promoted to professor in 1978. Later he joined the University of Michigan (1979–1985) and Columbia University (1984–1992). Since 1990 Farrell has been a faculty member at SUNY Binghamton.

In 1970, Farrell was invited to give a 50-minute address at the International Congress of Mathematicians about his thesis in Nice, France. 
In 1990, for their joint work on Rigidity in Geometry and Topology, his co-author Lowell E. Jones was invited to give a 45-minute address at the International Congress of Mathematicians in Kyoto, Japan.

Mathematical contributions 
Much of Farrell's work lies around the Borel conjecture. He and his co-authors have verified the conjecture for various cases, most notably flat manifolds, nonpositively curved  manifolds.

In his thesis, Farrell solved the problem of determining when a manifold (of dimension greater than 5) can fiber over a circle.

In 1977, he introduced Tate–Farrell cohomology, which is a generalization to infinite groups of the Tate cohomology theory for finite groups.

In 1993, he and his co-author Lowell E. Jones introduced the Farrell–Jones conjecture and made contributions on it. The conjecture plays an important role in manifold topology.

References

1941 births
Living people
Topologists
20th-century American mathematicians
21st-century American mathematicians
Mathematicians from Ohio
University of Notre Dame alumni
Yale Graduate School of Arts and Sciences alumni
University of Michigan faculty
Pennsylvania State University faculty
Columbia University faculty
Binghamton University faculty
Academic staff of Tsinghua University